= Fukushū ga Tarinai =

Japanese manga series

- First tankōbon volume cover

復讐が足りない
- Genre: Suspense
- Manga
- Written by: Umeko Fuyuno
- Published by: Kodansha
- Imprint: Morning KC
- Magazine: Comic Days
- Original run: August 5, 2025 – present
- Volumes: 4

Fukushū ga Tarinai (復讐が足りない) is a Japanese manga series written and illustrated by Umeko Fuyuno. It began serialization on Kodansha's Comic Days manga website in August 2025.

== Synopsis ==
Akari Fukuta is an employee of a small IT company who was recently made a full-time employee. Akari tries to adjust to society by keeping hidden her violent tendencies which tend to manifest whenever she is asked to work for her colleagues while on break, and when colliding with old men. One day, Akari learns about a female employee leaving the company, and discovers that the reason for her departure was due to sexual assault, which leads her to no longer suppress her violent tendencies.

== Publication ==
Written and illustrated by Umeko Fuyuno, Fukushū ga Tarinai began serialization on Kodansha's Comic Days manga website on August 5, 2025. Its chapters have been collected in four tankōbon volumes as of September 2026.

No.	Release date	ISBN
1	December 10, 2025	978-4-06-541709-6
2	March 11, 2026	978-4-06-542888-7
3	June 10, 2026	978-4-06-543737-7
4	September 9, 2026	978-4-06-544673-7
5	December 9, 2026	978-4-06-546148-8

== Reception ==
The series was ranked second in the fifth Crea Late Night Manga Awards in 2026.
